Vic (or ) is the capital of the comarca of Osona, in the province of Barcelona, Catalonia, Spain.

Geography

Vic lies in the middle of the Plain of Vic, equidistant from Barcelona and the Pyrenees.

Vic has persistent fog in winter as a result of a thermal inversion, with temperatures as low as -10 °C, an absolute record of -24 °C and episodes of cold and severe snowstorms. For this reason the natural vegetation includes the pubescent oak typical of the sub-Mediterranean climates of eastern France, Northern Italy and the Balkans.

Names 

Originally known as Auso, it was known in Latin as Vicus Ausonae. From Latin vicus (neighborhood or urban population), it became Vich in Old Catalan.

In 1538, Lorenzo de Padilla writes Vic Bique and it appears as Vique in the Memorial of the Bishop of Vic, Antonio Pascual (ca. 1694)  In 1715, Spain's Nueva Planta decrees for Catalonia gave the city the Spanish name of Vique; an invention which tried to avoid a consonant ending that is uncomfortable in the Spanish language, applying the logic of cases such as Mastrique (Maastricht). However, this artificial variant only remained for a time in Spanish official texts and, as early as 1789, it reappeared in the gazetteer as Vich.

In 1913 the new orthographic regulations by the Institute for Catalan Studies of 1913 eliminated from the Catalan language the mute h at the end of the word and in intervocalic position to simplify the spelling (Normes ortogràfiques). Other analogous cases are those of Montjuïch, Hostalrich and Reixach, which are now written as Montjuïc, Hostalric and Reixac, respectively.

Since 1982, the official name has been Vic.

History 

Vic is of ancient origin. In past times it was called Ausa by the Romans. Iberian coins bearing this name have been found there. The Visigoths called it Ausona. Sewage caps on sidewalks around the city will also read "Vich", an old spelling of the name.

During the 8th and 9th centuries, Vic sat in the Spanish Marches that separated Frankish and Islamic forces. It was destroyed in 788 during a Muslim incursion. Afterwards only one quarter was rebuilt, which was called Vicus Ausonensis (vicus is Latin for city borough), from which the name Vic was derived. It was repopulated by Wilfred the Hairy in 878 who gained control over the high part of the city and gave up the lowest part to the bishop to construct the episcopal see. From then on, the city was ruled by the count of Barcelona and by the bishop of Vic.

At a council in Toulouges in 1027, the bishop of Vic established the first Peace and Truce of God that helped reduce private warfare.

During the 14th century, several Jews flocked to the city and attained prominence, such as Salomo Abraham Taroç. 

During the 18th century the city was the first focus of the rebellion against the centralist policy of King Philip V of Spain. The conflict became the War of the Spanish Succession. 

In the early 20th century Vic had 9500 inhabitants, and in 1992 it hosted roller hockey events of the Barcelona 1992 Summer Olympics. The town has been described as "a hotbed of secessionist sentiment".

An ETA car bombing in 1991 killed 10 people.

Ecclesiastical history

The bishopric is a suffragan of the archbishopric of Tarragona, bounded on the north by Girona, on the east by Girona and Barcelona, on the south by Barcelona and Tarragona, on the west by Tarragona and Lleida. It lies within the four Catalan provinces, but the greater part of it in that of Barcelona.

The introduction of Christianity was early. Martyrs of Ausa are recorded in the time of Emperor Decius, and in the earliest records of the Tarraconensian mention Bishop of Vic. None, however, is mentioned by name until 516 when Cinidius is named as assisting at the provincial Council of Tarragona and Girona. Aquilinus (589–99) attended the third Council of Toledo; Esteban, the fourth and one at Egara; Dominus, the sixth of Toledo; Guericus, the eighth; Wisefredus sent his vicar to the thirteenth, and attended in person the fifteenth and sixteenth. With this bishop ends the history of the Church of Ausona before the Saracen invasion.

The reconquest of Vic was begun in the time of Louis the Pious, who confided the civil government to Borrell, Count of Ausona, all ecclesiastical matters being under the direction of the Archbishop of Narbonne.

In 826 Vic fell once more into the hands of the Moors and was finally reconquered by Wilfred the Hairy, independent Count of Barcelona.

Count Wilfred dedicated the monastery of Ripoll to the Blessed Virgin, and obtained from the Archbishop of Narbonne the consecration of Godmarus as Bishop of Vic. The bishops and the family of Montcada disputed the right of sovereignty over the city until 1315, when Bishop Berenguer Saguardia ceded his rights to the king, James II, who also purchased the rights of the Montcada.

Bishop Atto (960–72) was a promoter of education. Many availed themselves of the advantages offered by his reforms, among them Gerbert, a monk from Aurillac (France), and Pope Sylvester II.

Another bishops of Vic was Oliba (1018–46), son of the Count of Besalú, and Abbot of Ripoll where he reconstructed and richly decorated the church. The dedication took place 15 January 1032. He also, with the help of Ermessenda, Countess of Barcelona, reconstructed the cathedral and dedicated it to Saints Peter and Paul on 31 August 1038. In the time of his successor Guillem of Balsareny the relics of its patron saints, the martyrs Lucianus and Marcianus, were found at Vic, and a council was held for the restoration of peace among the faithful.

Berenguer Sunifred reformed the chapter, expelling lax members and introducing regular observance. Berenguer obtained for himself the dignity of Archbishop of Tarragona, which was contested by the Bishop of Narbonne. Among the Spanish bishops who attended the Council of Trent was Acisclo Moya de Contreras, Bishop of Vic, who was accompanied by the theologian Pedro Mercado.

Among more recent bishops, Josep Morgades restored the monastery of Ripoll, destroyed and pillaged by the revolutionists, and reconsecrated its church on 1 July 1893. He also established at Vic an archaeological museum where he collected many treasures of medieval art which had been dispersed among the ancient churches of the diocese. The next Bishop of Vic was Josep Torras i Bages, a man of great culture and learning.

Other natives of the Vic diocese include:

 Saint Anthony Mary Claret, archbishop of Santiago de Cuba, confessor of Isabella II of Spain and founder of the Congregation of the Missionaries of the Immaculate Heart of Mary, in North America also known as the Claretians.
 Archbishop Joseph Sadoc Alemany, Dominican and first archbishop of San Francisco, California. 

Another part of the catholic culture is St. Michael the Archangel

Culture 

Among other centers and institutions working to promote culture education, Vic hosts:
The Universitat de Vic, a youngUniversity that, according to its numbers, has grown to be the most important outside the four main cities of Catalonia.
The Museu episcopal, a medieval art museum administered by the bishopric.
The Museu de la pell, a museum dedicated to leathers. 
The markets, trade fairs and festivals. Especially the Mercat de música viva de Vic & Mercat Medieval.

Economy
For centuries, the city's primary industrial and commercial activity was a textile industry, now almost disappeared. Nowadays, the pillars of the economy are agriculture and other alimentary industries, and construction.

The city produces sausages and other pork derivatives, especially fuet, a thin cured sausage. The making of cured sausages and cold meats stems from the long tradition of pig farming in the Vic plain.

Main sights

It is disputed whether the Church of Sant Pere Apòstol or Sta. Maria la Rodona was the first cathedral church. For centuries the bishops celebrated the first Christmas Mass in this church, and the third in that of Sant Pere.

The ancient Church of St. Mary was rebuilt from the foundations by Canon Guillem Bonfil in 1140, and consecrated forty years later by Bishop Pere Retorta. In 1787 it was demolished to make room for the new Cathedral. Bishop Jordi (915–38) reconsecrated the Church of Ripoll and also consecrated that of St. Mary of Manresa.

The original cathedral, which had but a single nave, thick walls, and few windows, was replaced by that built by Bishop Oliva. As early as the 13th century, Bishop Raimond d'Anglesola wrote a pastoral letter exhorting his people to contribute towards repairing the cathedral. In 1401 Bishop Diego de Heredia added a transept, and in 1585 the door of Sant Joan was added, but the necessity of a complete reconstruction was soon recognized, and towards the end of the 18th century the building was torn down, and the cornerstone of the new one was laid on 24 September 1781. It was consecrated on 15 September 1803. It is classic in design, a combination of Doric and Tuscan, with a façade of white stone enriched with a balustrade. It has three entrances, corresponding to the three naves, and colossal statutes of its six patrons. The interior is Corinthian. All the monuments and altars were destroyed when the old church was demolished, except the high altar which is of alabaster, in the Gothic style, and was given early in the 15th century by D. Bernat Despujol. Among the chapels is that of St. Bernat Calvó (1233–43), who assisted James I of Aragon in the conquest of Valencia. A Gothic doorway leading to the chapter house has been preserved.

The conciliar seminary was begun in 1635 by Gaspar Gil and was finally finished, by command of Pope Benedict XIV, by Manuel Muñoz in 1748. The modern seminary is located in the former Jesuit College. It has sent out many famous men, among them Balmes and the poet Jacint Verdaguer, author of "L'Atlàntida". The episcopal palace was destroyed in the wars of 1640 and rebuilt in stages, being completed by Bishop Veyan. The archaeological museum is in this building.

Manresa, where St. Ignatius Loyola wrote his Spiritual Exercises, is situated in the Diocese of Vic. His memory is venerated in the Santa Cova, which has been converted into a church, and a college of the Jesuits built near it.

Demography 

Vic has 20,000 registered voters.

Miscellaneous
The University of Vic never attained any great importance; it is not known when or by whom it was founded. King Philip II granted it the privilege of conferring degrees, but only in philosophy and the arts (1599). Philip V, in the Corts of Barcelona (1702), granted it the power to confer degrees in theology and other higher sciences.

The remains of Jaume Balmes, the Spanish philosopher of the 19th century, are interred in the cloister of the cathedral. His first centenary was celebrated at Vic by a Catholic Congress. Architect Antoni Gaudí (who lived in Vic for three weeks during May 1910) designed two basalt and wrought iron lampposts for the Plaça Major of Vic in honour of Balmes's centenary. The lampposts were inaugurated on 7 September 1910 but destroyed in 1924.

Other natives of Vic include:
Trinitarian Saint Michael de Sanctis
Joseph Sadoc Alemany, (1814–1888), born in Vic, later Archbishop of San Francisco
Caterina Coromina i Agustí (1824–1893), religious woman beatified in 2006

On December 22, 2005, some inhabitants of the city won a total prize of about 500 million euros in the Spanish Christmas Lottery.

Sport
The city has a roller hockey team, CHP Vic, who plays at the OK Liga.

Sources and references

 Panareda Clopés, Josep Maria; Rius Calvet, Jaume; Rabella Vives, Josep Maria (1989). Guia de Catalunya, Barcelona: Caixa de Catalunya.  (Spanish).  (Catalan).

Paul Freedman, "The Diocese of Vic" has broad implications for the medieval history of Catalonia in general
Diocese of Vic general information of the Catholic-Hierarchy website

External links 

  
 Government data pages 

Municipalities in Osona